Cardinia may refer to:

 Cardinia, Victoria
 Shire of Cardinia, Victoria
 Cardinia Creek
 Cardinia Reservoir
 Cardinia Dam Power Station
 Cardinia Transit, a bus and coach operator